Ndi Oji Abam is a town in Arochukwu local government area, Abia State, Nigeria.

References

Populated places in Abia State